For All Slaves a Song of False Hope is an EP by Gnaw Their Tongues, released in September 2008 by Burning World. The title of the track "Aderlating" would serve as the name of de Jong's band. The album would appear in its entirety on the compilation Collected Atrocities 2005–2008, released in 2015.

Track listing

Personnel
Adapted from the For All Slaves a Song of False Hope liner notes.
 Maurice de Jong (as Mories) – vocals, instruments, recording, cover art

Release history

References

External links 
 
 For All Slaves a Song of False Hope at Bandcamp

2008 EPs
Gnaw Their Tongues albums